Admiral Hoffman may refer to:

Kurt-Caesar Hoffmann (1895–1988), German Navy vice admiral
Paul Hoffmann (naval officer) (1846–1917), Imperial German Navy vice admiral
Roy Hoffmann (born 1925), U.S. Navy rear admiral
Theodor Hoffmann (admiral) (1935–2018), East German Navy admiral

See also
Michel Hofman (fl. 1970s–2020s), Belgian Navy admiral